This list covers known nickel hyperaccumulators, accumulators or plant species tolerant to nickel.

See also:
Hyperaccumulators table – 1 : Ag, Al, As, Be, Cr, Cu, Hg, Mn, Mo, Naphthalene, Pb, Pd, Se, Zn
Hyperaccumulators table – 3 : Cd, Cs, Co, Pu, Ra, Sr, U,  radionuclides, hydrocarbons, organic solvents, etc.

Notes
 In the genus Alyssum, free histamin (His) is an important Ni binding ligand that increases in the xylem proportionately to root Ni uptake. There is a close correlation between Ni tolerance, root His concentration, and ATP-PRT transcript abundance. Thus ATP-PRT expression may play a major role in regulating the pool of free His and contributes to the exceptional Ni tolerance of hyperaccumulator Alyssum species. But this is not the complete hyperaccumulator phenotype because His-(GM-)overproducing lines do not exhibit increased Ni concentrations in either xylem sap or shoot tissue.
 Alpine pennycress or «Alpine Pennygrass» is also found as «Alpine Pennycrest» in (some books).

Reference sources with notes 
 The references are so far mostly from academic trial papers, experiments and generally of exploration of that field.

See also

Phytoremediation, Hyperaccumulators
List of hyperaccumulators
Hyperaccumulators table – 3

+02
Nickel
Hyperaccumulators|+02
Pollution control technologies
Lists of plants
Science-related lists